José Socorro Neri Valenzuela (born 27 June 1946) is a Mexican middle-distance runner. He competed in the men's 1500 metres at the 1968 Summer Olympics.

References

External links
 

1946 births
Living people
Athletes (track and field) at the 1968 Summer Olympics
Mexican male middle-distance runners
Olympic athletes of Mexico
Athletes (track and field) at the 1967 Pan American Games
Pan American Games competitors for Mexico
Competitors at the 1966 Central American and Caribbean Games
Competitors at the 1974 Central American and Caribbean Games
Central American and Caribbean Games silver medalists for Mexico
Central American and Caribbean Games bronze medalists for Mexico
Athletes from Mexico City
Central American and Caribbean Games medalists in athletics
20th-century Mexican people
21st-century Mexican people